Joseph A. Santiago (born December 19, 1964) is a Filipino politician. A member of the Nationalist People's Coalition, he has been elected to three terms as a Member of the House of Representatives of the Philippines, representing the Lone District of Catanduanes. First elected in 2001, he was re-elected in 2004 and 2007.

A graduate of the San Beda College of Law, Santiago was formerly an executive with the Pilipino Telephone Corporation. In 1998, he was appointed by President Joseph Estrada as Commissioner of the National Telecommunications Commission, and he served in that capacity until his election to Congress. From 1997 to 1998, Santiago served as team manager of the Mobiline Cellulars professional basketball team in the Philippine Basketball Association.

References

 
 

Basketball executives
20th-century Filipino lawyers
People from Catanduanes
1964 births
Living people
Bicolano people
Bicolano politicians
Nationalist People's Coalition politicians
Members of the House of Representatives of the Philippines from Catanduanes
San Beda University alumni
Heads of government agencies of the Philippines
Estrada administration personnel
PLDT people